Nikolai Denisovich Pokidyshev (born 17 June 1997) is a Russian football player. He plays for FC Shinnik Yaroslavl in Russian First League.

Club career
He made his debut in the Russian Professional Football League for FC Saturn Ramenskoye on 18 May 2015 in a game against FC Strogino Moscow.

He made his Russian Football National League debut for FC Shinnik Yaroslavl on 17 July 2018 in a game against FC Avangard Kursk.

References

External links
 Profile by Russian Professional Football League

1997 births
People from Pavlovo-Posadsky District
Sportspeople from Moscow Oblast
Living people
Russian footballers
Association football defenders
FC Saturn Ramenskoye players
FC Shinnik Yaroslavl players
Russian First League players
Russian Second League players